Reborn is the first full-length album by Finnish heavy metal cover supergroup Northern Kings, released on October 31, 2007. The album sold over 17,000 copies in Finland alone and thus was certified gold.

Two singles were released from this album: "We Don't Need Another Hero" (Tina Turner cover, from the soundtrack of Mad Max Beyond Thunderdome) and "Hello" (Lionel Richie cover). A music video was also produced for the first single.

Track listing

Personnel

Northern Kings
Marko Hietala – vocals
Tony Kakko – vocals
Jarkko Ahola – vocals
Juha-Pekka Leppäluoto – vocals

Musicians
Two Finger Choir: Backing Vocals
Vili Ollila: Piano, Keyboards, Programming
Erkka Korhonen: Lead & Rhythm Guitars
Erkki Silvennoinen: Bass
Anssi Nykanen, Sami Osala: Drums, Percussion

Production
Vocal Arrangements: Aleksi Parviainen & Erkka Korhonen (tracks 1, 2, 4, 6, 7, 9-13) & Tony Kakko (3, 5, 8)
Arranged By Aleksi Parviainen (1-6, 8, 10, 11), Jarko Ahola (7, 9, 12) & Mikko Mustonen (13)
Produced, Recorded & Engineered By Erkka Korhonen
Mixed By Mikko Karmila
Mastered By Svante Forsback

References

External links 

2007 albums
Northern Kings albums